Statistics of Belgian First Division in the 1911–12 season.

Overview

It was contested by 12 teams, and Daring Club de Bruxelles won the championship.

League standings

Results

See also
1911–12 in Belgian football

References

Belgian Pro League seasons
Belgian First Division, 1913-14
1911–12 in Belgian football